James Bradberry IV (born August 4, 1993) is an American football cornerback for the Philadelphia Eagles of the National Football League (NFL). He played college football at Samford and was drafted by the Carolina Panthers in the second round of the 2016 NFL Draft. Bradberry has also been a member of the New York Giants.

Professional career

Carolina Panthers
The Carolina Panthers selected Bradberry in the second round (62nd overall) of the 2016 NFL Draft out of Samford University. He was the 11th cornerback selected in 2016 and the first of three cornerbacks drafted by the Panthers.
 On May 10, 2016, Bradberry signed a four-year, 3.69 million contract with the team.

2016
Defensive coordinator Sean McDermott held a competition during training camp to name a new starting cornerback after the Panthers released Josh Norman. Bradberry competed against Robert McClain for the job. Head coach Ron Rivera named Bradberry the starting cornerback, along with veteran Bené Benwikere, to start the regular season.

He made his professional regular season debut and first career start in the Carolina Panthers' season-opener at the Denver Broncos and made six combined tackles and a pass deflection in a 21–20 loss. He made his first career tackle on running back C. J. Anderson during the first drive of the game.

On September 18, 2016, Bradberry made two combined tackles, two pass deflections, and made his first career interception off a pass by quarterback Blaine Gabbert in the Panthers' 46–27 victory against the San Francisco 49ers in Week 2. On October 2, 2016, he made two solo tackles before exiting the Panthers' 48–33 loss at the Atlanta Falcons in the second quarter with an injury. Bené Benwikere and fellow rookie Daryl Worley, who replaced Bradberry, gave up over 300 receiving yards to Julio Jones. On October 7, 2016, the Carolina Panthers released their No. 1 cornerback, Benwikere in response to the secondary's embarrassing performance at the Falcons.

His release made Bradberry became the team's No. 1 cornerback on their depth chart with fellow rookie Daryl Worley as the No. 2 starting cornerback and Zack Sanchez as their backup at No. 3. Bradberry was inactive for the next three games (Weeks 5–8) due to a severe case of turf toe he sustained during the loss to the Falcons. 
In Week 13, Bradberry collected a season-high eight combined tackles and broke up a pass during a 40–7 loss to the Seattle Seahawks.

On January 1, 2017, Bradberry made six solo tackles, two pass deflections, and intercepted Jameis Winston during a 17–16 loss at the Tampa Bay Buccaneers. He finished his rookie season with 59 combined tackles (47 solo), ten pass deflections, and two interceptions in 13 games and 13 starts. Pro Football Focus gave Bradberry an overall grade of 82.6, ranking him 20th among all cornerbacks in 2016. He also graded out as the top ranked rookie cornerback and the Panthers' top defensive back.

2017
On June 5, 2017, Bradberry suffered a fractured wrist during OTAs and was ruled out for a least a month. Head coach Ron Rivera named Bradberry and Worley the starting outside cornerbacks with newly acquired free agent Captain Munnerlyn as the starting nickelback.

On October 12, 2017, Bradberry recorded six combined tackles, broke up a pass, and made his first career sack on quarterback Carson Wentz during a 28–23 loss to the Philadelphia Eagles. In Week 14, he made six combined tackles, a season-high three pass deflections, and intercepted a pass by  Case Keenum in the Panthers' 31–24 victory over the Minnesota Vikings. The following week, Bradberry recorded a season-high seven combined tackles, a pass deflection, and intercepted a pass by Aaron Rodgers during a 31–24 victory against the Green Bay Packers. Bradberry finished the  season with 85 combined tackles (66 solo), ten pass deflections, three interceptions, and a sack in 16 games and 16 starts. Pro Football Focus gave Bradberry an overall grade of 42.4, ranking him 109th among all qualifying cornerbacks in 2017.

The Carolina Panthers finished second in the NFC South with an 11–5 record and received a Wildcard berth. On January 7, 2018, Bradberry started in his first career playoff game and recorded seven combined tackles as the Panthers lost 31–26 at the New Orleans Saints in the NFC Wildcard Game.

2018
Bradberry entered 2018 as a starting cornerback alongside rookie Donte Jackson. He started all 16 games, recording 70 combined tackles, a sack, an interception, and a team-leading 15 pass deflections.

2019

In Week 1 against the Los Angeles Rams, Bradberry made his first sack and interception of Jared Goff in a 27–30 loss.
In Week 6 against the Tampa Bay Buccaneers, Bradberry recorded a team high ten tackles and made two interceptions off Jameis Winston in the 37–26 win.

New York Giants

On March 26, 2020, Bradberry signed a three-year, $45 million contract with the New York Giants.

In Week 2 against the Chicago Bears, Bradberry recorded his first interception as a Giant off a pass thrown by Mitchell Trubisky during the 17–13 loss. In Week 6, Bradberry recorded another interception from Kyle Allen in a 20–19 victory over the Washington Football Team. In Week 7, Bradberry recorded his third interception on the season from Carson Wentz in a 22–21 loss to the Philadelphia Eagles on Thursday Night Football. He was placed on the reserve/COVID-19 list by the team on December 17, 2020, and activated on December 21.

2021
During the offseason Bradberry restructured his contract in order to give the team some cap room. In week 2 against the Washington Football Team, he recorded an interception. It was announced on October 2 that Bradberry once again restructured his contract to increase cap room for the Giants.

Bradberry was released on May 9, 2022, after the Giants failed to find a trade partner.

Philadelphia Eagles
On May 18, 2022, Bradberry signed a one-year, $7.5 million contract (plus incentives) with the Philadelphia Eagles.

In Super Bowl LVII against the Kansas City Chiefs, Bradberry was called for a controversial holding call on JuJu Smith-Schuster while the Chiefs were in the Eagles' 15-yard line. The penalty proved costly for the Eagles as Harrison Butker kicked a game-winning field goal with 11 seconds left leading to the Chiefs' 38–35 win. Bradberry later admitted that the holding call was correct saying, "It was a holding. I tugged his jersey. I was hoping they would let it slide."

On March 15, 2023, Bradberry signed a three-year contract extension with the Eagles.

References

External links 
 Philadelphia Eagles bio
 New York Giants bio
 Samford Bulldogs bio

1993 births
Living people
African-American players of American football
American football cornerbacks
Carolina Panthers players
National Conference Pro Bowl players
New York Giants players
People from Pleasant Grove, Alabama
Philadelphia Eagles players
Players of American football from Alabama
Samford Bulldogs football players
21st-century African-American sportspeople